Thomas Dawes Eliot (March 20, 1808 – June 14, 1870), was a Senator and Congressman of the United States House of Representatives from Massachusetts, and a member of the prominent Eliot family.

Life and career
Eliot was born on March 20, 1808 in Boston, the son of Margaret Greenleaf (Dawes) and William Greenleaf Eliot. He was named after his grandfather Justice Thomas Dawes of the Massachusetts Supreme Judicial Court.

Eliot attended the public schools of Washington, D.C., and graduated from Columbian College in the District of Columbia, (now George Washington University in 1825.  He was admitted to the bar and commenced practice in New Bedford, Massachusetts.

In 1834 Eliot married Frances L. Brock of Nantucket.

Eliot served as a member of the Massachusetts House of Representatives, and served in the Massachusetts State Senate.  He was elected as a Whig to the Thirty-third Congress to fill the vacancy caused by the resignation of Zeno Scudder and served from April 17, 1854, to March 3, 1855.  He declined to be a candidate for renomination.  Eliot was a delegate to the Free Soil Convention in Worcester in 1855.

He declined to be a candidate for nomination by the Republican for Attorney General of Massachusetts in 1857.  He was elected as a Republican to the Thirty-sixth and to the four succeeding Congresses (March 4, 1859 – March 3, 1869).  Eliot served as Chairman of the Committee Freedmen’s Affairs (Thirty-ninth and Fortieth Congresses), and the Committee on Commerce (Fortieth Congress).  He declined to be a candidate for renomination in 1868. He resumed the practice of law and died on June 14, 1870.  His interment was in Oak Grove Cemetery.

Eliot's daughter Ida M. Eliot was a notable educator and writer.  Thomas Eliot's younger brother was philanthropist and Unitarian minister, William Greenleaf Eliot.

References

External links
photograph of Thomas Eliot by Mathew B. Brady, The Bancroft Library

Members of the Massachusetts House of Representatives
Massachusetts state senators
George Washington University Law School alumni
1808 births
1870 deaths
Massachusetts Whigs
Massachusetts Free Soilers
Whig Party members of the United States House of Representatives
Republican Party members of the United States House of Representatives from Massachusetts
19th-century American politicians